Caligopsis is a genus of owl butterfly in the family Nymphalidae.

Species
Caligopsis seleucida (Hewitson, 1877)

References

Morphinae
Nymphalidae of South America
Nymphalidae genera